The 1974 Cypriot coup d'état was a military coup d'état sponsored by the Greek Army in Cyprus, the Cypriot National Guard and the Greek military junta. On 15 July 1974 the coup plotters removed the sitting President of Cyprus, Archbishop Makarios III from office and installed pro-Enosis nationalist Nikos Sampson. The Sampson regime was described as a puppet state, whose ultimate aim was the annexation of the island by Greece; in the short term, the coupists proclaimed the establishment of the "Hellenic Republic of Cyprus". The coup was viewed as illegal by the United Nations.

Background 
The Republic of Cyprus was established in 1960 with the London and Zurich Agreements, and the Greek Cypriots and Turkish Cypriots were the two founding communities. However, following constitutional amendments that were proposed by Makarios III and rejected by Turkish Cypriots, intercommunal violence erupted throughout the island, the Turkish Cypriot representation in the government ended partially due to forced prevention and partially due to willing withdrawal, and Turkish Cypriots started living in enclaves.

Greece had established a national policy of enosis to achieve the island's union with Greece since the 1950s. After 1964, the Greek government tried to control Makarios' policies, and following his unwillingness to obey Athens, attempted to destabilize his government. While the Greek policy shifted to a more cooperative one after 1967, when an extremist military junta took power in Greece, it supported the far-right EOKA-B group against Makarios. Dimitrios Ioannidis, the de facto leader of the junta, believed that Makarios was no longer a true supporter of enosis, and suspected him of being a communist sympathizer. Between 1971 and 1974, five plans were prepared by the Greek government to overthrow Makarios' government.

The coup 

The coup was ordered by Dimitrios Ioannidis, the shadow leader of the Greek junta, and Greek officers led the Cypriot National Guard to capture the Presidential Palace in Nicosia. The building was almost entirely burned down. Makarios narrowly escaped death in the attack. He fled the presidential palace from its back door and went to Paphos, where the British managed to retrieve him in the afternoon of 16 July and flew him from Akrotiri to Malta in a Royal Air Force transport plane, and from there to London the next morning. On 19 July, he attended a United Nations Security Council meeting in New York and gave a speech, in which he stated that Cyprus had been invaded by Greece.

The newly established regime has been described as an extremist puppet regime of the Greek junta. On 15 July, between 8 am and 9 am, the coup leaders proclaimed their victory on the state channel Cyprus Broadcasting Corporation, saying "The national guard intervened in order to solve the problematical situation. [...]. Makarios is dead." However, before his flight, Makarios announced that he was alive from a private broadcast in Paphos. The new government heavily censored the press and stopped left-wing newspapers being printed. Only right-wing newspapers Machi, Ethniki and Agon continued publishing, and their style was very propagandistic. Sampson did not openly announce his intention of enosis in the days following the coup, but instead focused on suppressing any support for Makarios and heavy propaganda to vilify his government.

In response, Rauf Denktaş, the leader of the Turkish Cypriot Administration, stated that he believed that the events were among Greek Cypriots and called for Turkish Cypriots not to go out, as well as for UNFICYP to take extensive security measures for Turkish Cypriots. The Cypriot National Guard made no attempts to enter the Turkish Cypriot enclaves, but raided Greek and Turkish Cypriot homes alike in mixed villages to confiscate weapons. The Turkish government brought claims that ammunition was being carried to Cyprus by Olympic Air to the attention of UNFICYP. Whether the Turkish Cypriots suffered as a direct result of the coup remains controversial, but Sampson was seen as an untrustworthy figure due to his pro-enosis policies and "brutal" role against Turkish Cypriots in 1963.

Following the coup, the newly established junta started a crackdown on Makarios supporters, resulting in a number of deaths and a "significant number", according to Frank Hoffmeister, being detained. The number of deaths from the coup remains a disputed issue, as the Republic of Cyprus lists the deaths due to the coup among the missing due to the Turkish invasion. According to Haralambos Athanasopulos, at least 500 Greek Cypriots have been placed on the list of 1617 Greek Cypriot missing people and their deaths blamed on the Turks and Turkish Cypriots. According to Milliyet on 19 July 1974, violent clashes had broken out in Paphos, and even excluding Paphos, the death toll due to Greek Cypriot infighting was about 300 civilians and 30 Greek soldiers, whose bodies were brought to Athens.

Aftermath 
In response to the coup, on 20 July 1974 Turkey invaded the island saying that the action was compliant with the 1960 Treaty of Guarantee, taking control of the north and dividing Cyprus along what became known as the Green Line, cutting off about a third of the total territory. Sampson resigned, the military regime that had appointed him collapsed, and Makarios returned. The Turkish Cypriots established an independent government for what they called the Turkish Federated State of Cyprus (TFSC), with Rauf Denktaş as president. In 1983 they would proclaim the Turkish Republic of Northern Cyprus on the northern part of the island, which remains a de facto state.

See also

 United Nations Buffer Zone in Cyprus
 Rodger P. Davies
 Republic of Cyprus
 Turkish Republic of Northern Cyprus

References 

Cyprus dispute
Military coups in Cyprus
Cyprus
Conflicts in 1974
1974 in Cyprus
July 1974 events in Europe
Turkish invasion of Cyprus
Greek junta